Shahritus (before 2021 Shahrituz .
, now Шаҳритӯс Shahritŭs) is a town in Khatlon Region, southwestern Tajikistan. Situated on the river Kofarnihon, the city was founded in 1938. Its population is 17,200 (January 2020 estimate). It is the seat of the Shahritus District.

Geography

Climate
Shahritus has a cold semi-arid climate (Köppen climate classification BSk). The average annual temperature is 17.2 °C (63.0 °F).

Transport 
The railway crosses the river at this point.

See also 
 Railway stations in Tajikistan

References

External links 
 Jamoat's Understanding of Poor Households

Populated places in Khatlon Region
Cities and towns built in the Soviet Union
Populated places established in 1938
1938 establishments in the Soviet Union